Mahanama may refer to 

Mahanama (arhat), with Kaundinya, an early follower of Gautama Buddha
Mahanama of Anuradhapura (fl. 412–434), King of Anuradhapura
Mahānāma, fifth century CE, author of the Mahāvaṃsa
Bibiladeniye Mahanama (born 1989), Buddhist monk and composer
Roshan Mahanama (born 1966), Sri Lankan cricketer
Shantha Bandara (1951–1990), alias Mahanama, Sri Lankan politician
Mahanama College in Colombo

See also
"Mah Nà Mah Nà", a popular song